James Forbes Duthie VI  (born May 13, 1966) is a Canadian sportscaster for TSN and the host of TSN's hockey coverage. He has a bachelor's degree in journalism from Carleton University.

Broadcasting career

Duthie is currently the host of TSN's hockey coverage, as well as the IIHF World Junior Hockey Championship, the CFL Grey Cup, and the MLS Cup.

Duthie is a four-time Canadian Screen Award winner, receiving the award for Best Sports Host in a Sports Program or Series in 2018, sharing the same award with SportsCentre anchor Rod Smith in 2014, winning Best Sports Feature Segment for his work on “The Butterfly Child” in 2016, and winning Best Sports Host for TSN's Free Agent Frenzy in 2019. Duthie is also a three-time Gemini Award winner, receiving recognition for his work on TSN’s coverage of the 2011 NHL All-Star Fantasy Draft, TradeCentre ’09, and his work on Canada’s Olympic Broadcast Media Consortium’s coverage of the Vancouver 2010 Olympic Winter Games, where he worked as co-host alongside Lisa Laflamme. Duthie also won the 2009 Excellence in Sports Broadcasting award from Sports Media Canada for his work as host of TSN’s NHL coverage.

Before moving to TSN in 1998, Duthie worked at VTV and covered sports for three years on CJOH, the CTV affiliate in Ottawa. At CTV Ottawa, he won an International Edward R. Murrow Award for news reporting.

James Duthie worked with CTV to produce the 2010 Olympic Games in Vancouver, and the 2012 Games in London.  He was one of the main hosts.  He is also known for producing many humorous videos for TSN including The Panel Hangover, Puck over Glass, and a series of bits featuring Roberto Luongo.

Duthie is a charity ambassador, representing the Christian Children's Fund of Canada in the cause to help beat poverty in developing countries.

James Duthie was a former touch football standout in the MTTFL.  Playing for Doom! in the “C” division, Duthie’s career was cut short due to a devastating downfield head to head collision.

Books

Duthie has released four books: They Call Me Killer (2010), a collection of stories from legendary junior hockey coach Brian Kilrea, the essay collection The Day I (Almost) Killed Two Gretzkys (2010), and The Guy on the Left (2015), which tells the story of Duthie’s career in broadcasting. Duthie's latest book Beauties: Hockey's Greatest Untold Stories (2020) is a collection of 57 stories from hockey’s finest superstars, journeymen, coaches, referees, broadcasters, agents, and hockey moms and dads.

Podcast

In 2017, Duthie launched The Rubber Boots Podcast, where he discusses sports and other topics with TSN staffers Lester McLean, Sean 'Puffy' Cameron, and Producer Stoff.

Filmography
 Goon: Last of the Enforcers (2016) as a sportscaster

References

1966 births
Canadian Football League announcers
Canadian television sportscasters
Carleton University alumni
Living people
National Hockey League broadcasters
National Basketball Association broadcasters
Sportspeople from Ottawa